Brandon Anderson (born December 10, 1985) is a former American football cornerback. He was signed by the Indianapolis Colts as an undrafted free agent in 2009. He played college football at Akron.

Anderson was also a member of the Cleveland Browns and Tampa Bay Buccaneers.

Early life
Anderson attended Pulaski County High School in Dublin, Virginia. While at Pulaski, Anderson played football, basketball and ran track & field. As a member of the football team, Anderson played both running back and defensive back.

After Pulaski, Anderson attended Hargrave Military Academy in Chatham, Virginia.

Anderson chose to attend the University of Akron, accepting a football scholarship from the Zips on December 26, 2004. Anderson also received scholarship offers from Memphis and Central Florida.

College career
In 2005 as a freshman, Anderson recorded 22 tackles and one interception playing as a special teams player and reserve defensive back In 2006, he returned 11 kickoffs for 157 yards with a long of 28 yards. Recorded 27 tackles and one interception. He also forced a fumble. He recorded 17 tackles and one sack in 2007. His senior year, he returned one kickoff for 17 yards. Had a career high 42 tackles and had one interception.
During his college career, he recorded 108 tackles, 1 sack, 1 forced fumble, and 3 interceptions.

Professional career

Pre-draft
Prior to the 2009 NFL Draft, Anderson was projected to be undrafted by NFLDraftScout.com. He was rated as the 79th-best cornerback in the draft. Anderson averaged 4.42 on his 40-yard dash, but ran a 4.34 on his fastest attempt. He was not invited to the NFL Scouting Combine, he posted the following numbers during his Akron pro-day workouts:

Indianapolis Colts
Anderson signed with the Indianapolis Colts after going undrafted.

Cleveland Browns
Anderson was a practice squad member of the Cleveland Browns in 2009.

Tampa Bay Buccaneers
Anderson signed with the Tampa Bay Buccaneers in 2009. After a season on the practice squad, the Buccaneers dressed Anderson for 3 games in 2010, where he did not record any statistics.

San Jose SaberCats
In January 2012, Anderson signed with the San Jose SaberCats of the Arena Football League.

Chicago Rush
Anderson was assigned to the Chicago Rush for the 2013 season, but was placed on recallable reassignment by the Rush before the season began.

Cleveland Gladiators
Two days after the Rush placed Anderson on recallable reassignment, he was claimed by the Cleveland Gladiators. Anderson played the 2013 season with the Gladiators. He was reassigned on November 21, 2013.

Anderson now lives at home with his parents and works with youth of Pulaski County in Virginia.

References

External links
Akron Zips bio
Tampa Bay Buccaneers bio

1985 births
Living people
People from Dublin, Virginia
Players of American football from Virginia
American football cornerbacks
Akron Zips football players
Indianapolis Colts players
Cleveland Browns players
Tampa Bay Buccaneers players
San Jose SaberCats players
Chicago Rush players
Cleveland Gladiators players